The Middlebury Panthers are the 31 varsity teams of Middlebury College that compete in the New England Small College Athletic Conference. The Panthers lead the NESCAC in total number of national championships, having won 34 team titles since the conference lifted its ban on NCAA play in 1994. Middlebury enjoys national success in soccer, cross country running, field hockey, men's basketball, women's hockey, skiing, men's lacrosse and women's lacrosse, and fields 31 varsity NCAA teams and several competitive club teams including a sailing team (MCSC), a crew team, a water polo team, an ultimate frisbee team, and a rugby team. Since 2000, Middlebury's varsity squads have won 84 NESCAC titles. Currently, 28% of students participate in varsity sports.

In the early 20th century, the Panthers' traditional athletic rivals included the University of Vermont and Norwich University.  Today, rivalries vary by sport but typically include Williams College, Hamilton College and Amherst College.

Notable achievements

Middlebury's success in intercollegiate sports is evidenced by the college's second-place ranking in the 2001, 2005, 2007, 2009 and 2011 National Association of Collegiate Directors of Athletics (NACDA) Directors' Cup. The college won the honor for the 2011–12 season.

 Middlebury boasts nearly 40 athletes who have competed in the Olympic Games.
In 1979 and 1980 the women's ski team won two AIAW national championships.
In 2003, Middlebury Water Polo won the Men's Division III Collegiate Club Championship.
From 2004 to 2006, both the men's and women's ice hockey teams won three consecutive NCAA Division III National Championships, an unprecedented feat for a college at any level. The men have won eight cumulative titles, while the women own five.
In 2007, Middlebury's Men's Soccer team captured its first NCAA Championship in the 54-year history of the program.
In 2007 and 2009, the Middlebury College Rugby Club won Division II USA Rugby Championships.
In 2010, two Middlebury Alumni, Garrott Kuzzy '06 and Simi Hamilton '09, represented the United States in Nordic Skiing at the 2010 Winter Olympics in Vancouver.
In 2011, the Middlebury men's basketball team reached the NCAA Division III Final Four for the first time in school history.
In 2013, the Middlebury women's soccer team reached the NCAA Division III  Final Four for the first time in school history. 
In 2019, Middlebury Water Polo won the Women's Division III Collegiate Club Championship.
In 2019, the Middlebury football team won the NESCAC Championship with a perfect 9–0 record, the first in NESCAC history.
From 2015 to 2021 the Women's Field Hockey team won 5 national championships.
In 2018, 2019, 2021, and 2022 the Men's Club Ultimate Frisbee team reached the national semifinals. The 2020 tournament was cancelled and the team won the championship in 2019.

National Championships
 Men's Ice Hockey – 8 (1995, 1996, 1997, 1998, 1999, 2004, 2005, 2006)
 Women's Lacrosse – 7 (1997, 1999, 2001, 2002, 2004, 2016, 2019)
 Women's Cross Country – 6 (2000, 2001, 2003, 2006, 2008, 2010)
 Women's Field Hockey – 6 (1998, 2015, 2017, 2018, 2019, 2021)
 Women's Ice Hockey – 5 (2000, 2001, 2004, 2005, 2006)
 Men's Lacrosse – 3 (2000, 2001, 2002)
 Men's Tennis – 3 (2004, 2010, 2018)
 Men’s Club Rugby – 2 (2007, 2009)
 Women's Club Ultimate Frisbee - 2 (2021, 2022)
 Men's Club Ultimate Frisbee - 2 (2013, 2019)
 Men's Soccer (2007)
 Men's Club Water Polo (2003)
 Women's Club Water Polo (2019)

Facilities

The 2011 Princeton Review ranks Middlebury's athletic facilities as #18 best in the United States.

Middlebury's athletic facilities include:

Middlebury's newest athletic facility, Virtue Field House, opened in January 2015. The 110,000-square-foot structure houses the New Balance Foundation Track, a 200-meter track with nine 60-meter sprint lanes. Dedicated jumping and vaulting areas beyond the oval for field events are also part of the facility, as is McCormick Field, a 21,000-square-foot Field Turf surface inside the track for varsity, club, intramural and recreational purposes as well as throwing events. 
50-meter by  Olympic-size swimming pool
3,500-seat Youngman Field at Alumni Stadium for football and lacrosse
2,100 spectator hockey arena
1,000 spectator natatorium
Regulation rugby pitch
Middlebury College Snow Bowl, the college-owned ski mountain
18-hole Ralph Myhre golf course
Rikert Nordic Center at the Bread Loaf Mountain campus
Fitness Center
Allan Dragone Track and Field Complex
Pepin gymnasium, home of the men's and women's basketball and volleyball teams
Field Turf men's soccer field
Indoor and outdoor tennis courts, paddle tennis courts, squash courts
Rock climbing wall
12 FJ-class sailboats, docks, and a practice facility in Panton, Vermont

See also
 List of Middlebury College alumni
 Middlebury College Rugby Club

References

External links
 

 
Vermont culture